Italian Open may refer to:
Italian Open (tennis), a Masters 1000 level tennis tournament played in Rome each year.
Italian Open (golf), a European Tour golf tournament.
Italian Open (darts)